The Machilidae are a family of insects belonging to the order Archaeognatha (the bristletails). There are around 250 described species worldwide. These insects are wingless, elongated and more or less cylindrical with a distinctive humped thorax and covered with tiny, close-fitting scales. The colour is usually grey or brown, sometimes intricately patterned. There are three "tails" at the rear of the abdomen: two cerci and a long central epiproct. They have large compound eyes, often meeting at a central point. They resemble the silverfish and the firebrat, which are from a different order, Zygentoma.

Machilids undergo virtually no metamorphosis during their life cycles, and both nymphs and adults are generally inconspicuous herbivores and scavengers. They can move very fast and often escape by jumping considerable distances when disturbed.

Like all Archaeognatha, machilids transfer sperm indirectly from male to female. Some species can spin silken threads that lead the female to the spermatophore. Other species can produce silken stalks on which they place droplets of sperm.

There are no aquatic species, but some littoral forms, such as Parapetrobius and Petrobius, can swim.

Their fossil records extends back into the Triassic with the genus Gigamachilis from the Middle Triassic of Italy and Switzerland, around 240 million years old.

Genera 

Afrochilis Sturm, 2002
Afromachilis Mendes, 1981
Allopsontus Silvestri, 1911
Bachilis Mendes, 1977
Catamachilis Silvestri, 1923
Charimachilis Wygodzinsky, 1939
Coreamachilis Mendes, 1993
Corethromachilis Carpenter, 1916
Dilta Strand, 1911
Graphitarsus Silvestri, 1908
Haslundichilis Wygodzinsky, 1950
Haslundiella Janetschek, 1954
Heteropsontus Mendes, 1990
Himalayachilis Wygodzinsky, 1952
Janetschekilis Wygodzinsky, 1958
Lepismachilis Verhoeff, 1910
Leptomachilis Sturm, 1991
Machilis Latrielle, 1832
Machilopsis Olfers, 1907
Mendeschilis Gaju, Mora, Molero & Bach, 2000
Mesomachilis Silvestri, 1911
Metagraphitarsus Paclt, 1969
Metamachilis Silvestri, 1936
Meximachilis Wygodzinsky, 1945
Neomachilis Silvestri, 1911
†Onychomachilis Pierce, 1951
Paetrobius Leach, 1815
Paramachilis Wygodzinsky, 1941
Parapetrobius Mendes, 1980
Parateutonia Verhoeff, 1910
Pedetontinus Silvestri, 1943
Pedetontoides Mendes, 1981
Pedetontus Silvestri, 1911
Petridiobius Paclt, 1970
Petrobiellus Silvestri, 1943
Petrobius Leach, 1817
Petromachilis Reilly, 1915
†Praemachilis Silvestri, 1904
Praemachiloides Janetschek, 1954
Praetrigoniophthalmus Janetschek, 1954
Promesomachilis Silvestri, 1923
Pseudocatamachilis Gaju & Bach, 1991
Pseudomachilanus Paclt, 1969
Silvestrichilis Wygodzinsky, 1950
Silvestrichiloides Mendes, 1990
Stachilis Janetschek, 1957
Trigoniomachilis Stach, 1937
Trigoniophthalmus Verhoeff, 1910
Wygodzinskilis Janetschek, 1954

Gallery

References

Chinery, Michael, Collins Guide to the Insects of Britain and Western Europe 1986 (Reprinted 1991)
McGavin, George C., Insects and Spiders 2004
Fauna Europaea
Nomina Insecta Nearctica

Archaeognatha
Insect families